Lyubov "Luba" Golovina (born 20 April 1990) is a Georgian trampoline gymnast of Russian descent who represented Georgia at three Olympiads: at the 2008 Summer Olympics, at the 2012 Summer Olympics, and at the 2016 Summer Olympics.

References

External links
 

1990 births
Living people
Female trampolinists from Georgia (country)
Olympic gymnasts of Georgia (country)
Gymnasts at the 2008 Summer Olympics
Gymnasts at the 2012 Summer Olympics
Gymnasts at the 2016 Summer Olympics
Georgian people of Russian descent
Sportspeople from Tbilisi
Gymnasts at the 2019 European Games
European Games medalists in gymnastics
European Games silver medalists for Georgia (country)
21st-century women from Georgia (country)